Cambria Township is a township in Cambria County, Pennsylvania, United States. The population was 5,781 at the 2020 census. It is part of the Johnstown, Pennsylvania Metropolitan Statistical Area and geographically surrounds the borough of Ebensburg, the Cambria County seat.

History
The Colver Historic District was listed on the National Register of Historic Places in 1994.  The Revloc Historic District was listed in 1995.

Geography
U.S. Route 22 crosses the township from east to west, U.S. Route 219 crosses it from north to south, and U.S. Route 422 leads west from Ebensburg across the western portion of the township.

Communities

Census-designated places
Census-designated places are geographical areas designated by the U.S. Census Bureau for the purposes of compiling demographic data. They are not actual jurisdictions under Pennsylvania law. Other unincorporated communities, such as villages, may be listed here as well.

 Colver
 Revloc

Unincorporated communities

 Bakersville
 Tripoli
 Winterset

Demographics

As of the census of 2000, there were 6,323 people, 2,015 households, and 1,470 families residing in the township.  The population density was 128.4 people per square mile (49.6/km2).  There were 2,105 housing units at an average density of 42.7/sq mi (16.5/km2).  The racial makeup of the township was 95.98% White, 2.99% African American, 0.11% Native American, 0.36% Asian, 0.06% Pacific Islander, 0.08% from other races, and 0.41% from two or more races. Hispanic or Latino of any race were 0.55% of the population.

There were 2,015 households, out of which 32.7% had children under the age of 18 living with them, 61.5% were married couples living together, 7.4% had a female householder with no husband present, and 27.0% were non-families. 24.0% of all households were made up of individuals, and 12.7% had someone living alone who was 65 years of age or older.  The average household size was 2.57 and the average family size was 3.06.

In the township the population was spread out, with 20.2% under the age of 18, 7.5% from 18 to 24, 28.4% from 25 to 44, 25.0% from 45 to 64, and 19.0% who were 65 years of age or older.  The median age was 42 years. For every 100 females there were 104.9 males.  For every 100 females age 18 and over, there were 102.7 males.

The median income for a household in the township was $32,995, and the median income for a family was $41,031. Males had a median income of $28,778 versus $22,772 for females. The per capita income for the township was $16,868.  About 6.6% of families and 10.5% of the population were below the poverty line, including 14.5% of those under age 18 and 9.6% of those age 65 or over.

References

External links
Cambria Township official website

Populated places established in 1798
Townships in Cambria County, Pennsylvania